WLCF-LD, virtual channel 45 (UHF digital channel 17), is a low-power Christian Television Network (CTN) owned-and-operated station licensed to Decatur, Illinois, United States. The station's transmitter is located north of Oreana, Illinois. WLCF-LD offers 24-hour religious programming, much of which is produced either locally or at the CTN home base in Clearwater, Florida.

CTN acquired WLCF from another religious broadcaster, Believers Broadcasting Corporation, in February 2008.

Subchannels
The station's digital signal is multiplexed:

References

External links
Official website

LCF-LD
Low-power television stations in the United States
Christian Television Network affiliates
Television channels and stations established in 1993
1993 establishments in Illinois
Decatur, Illinois